Ladegården may refer to:

 Ladegården, Copenhagen, a former farm and building complex from 1623 to 1920 in Copenhagen, Denmark
 Oslo Ladegård, a manor house situated at Gamlebyen in Oslo, Norway
 Ladegården, Bergen, a neighborhood in the borough of Bergenhus, Bergen, Norway